Inape bicornis is a species of moth of the family Tortricidae. It is found in Ecuador (Azuay Province).

References

Moths described in 1999
Endemic fauna of Ecuador
Moths of South America
bicornis
Taxa named by Józef Razowski